

Chronological table
The following is a table of United States presidential election results by state. They are indirect elections in which voters in each state cast ballots for a slate of electors of the U.S. Electoral College who pledge to vote for a specific political party's nominee for President.

 Bold italic text indicates the winner of the election
 ‡ indicates the winner lost the popular vote
 † indicates the winner was decided by the House of Representatives

Legend 

 R = Republican                      
 D = Democratic                      
 DR = Democratic-Republican               
 W = Whig                                  
 F = Federalist                      
 GW = George Washington                                               
 NR = National Republican                   
 SD = Southern Democrat                            
 BM = Progressive "Bull Moose"
 LR = Liberal Republican     
 AI = American Independent                 
 SR = States' Rights                  
 PO = Populist                         
 CU = Constitutional Union 
 I = Independent                             
 PR = Progressive             
 ND = Northern Democrat                     
 KN = Know Nothing                                                    
 AM = Anti-Masonic                                 
 N = Nullifier                                        
 SP = Split evenly

Chronological table with states listed by Census region
Bolded means the party won the national election that year

Northeast

South

Midwest

West

Analytical table 
Note that there are separate columns for votes since 1856. That was the first election to feature both Democratic and Republican parties. Data shown through 2020.

Maps

See also
 Electoral vote changes between presidential elections
 List of United States Senate election results by state

References 
 http://psephos.adam-carr.net/countries/u/usa/pres.shtml
 National Archives

United States presidential elections statistics